Endiandra sankeyana, commonly known as Sankey's walnut, is a plant in the family Lauraceae endemic to the Wet Tropics of Queensland.

Description
They are followed by small blue fruits measuring up to  containing a single seed.

Distribution and habitat
It grows in rainforest on a variety of soils.

Ecology
Fruits of this species are eaten by Musky rat-kangaroos and cassowries.

Conservation
This species is listed by both the Queensland Department of Environment and Science and the IUCN as least concern.

References

External links
 
 
 View a map of historical sightings of this species at the Australasian Virtual Herbarium
 View observations of this species on iNaturalist
 View images of this species on Flickriver

sankeyana
Endemic flora of Queensland
Taxa named by Frederick Manson Bailey
Taxa described in 1893
Laurales of Australia